Allan George Balding (April 29, 1924 – July 30, 2006) was a Canadian professional golfer, who won four events on the PGA Tour. In 1955 he became the first Canadian to win a PGA Tour event in the United States; Canadians Ken Black (1936 Vancouver Jubilee Open), Jules Huot (1937 General Brock Open) and Pat Fletcher (1954 Canadian Open) had won PGA Tour events in Canada.

Biography
Balding was born in Toronto, Ontario on April 29, 1924. Growing up during the Great Depression, Balding quit school in the 7th grade and began caddying at the nearby Islington golf course, despite not previously golfing before. Balding enlisted in the Canadian Army at 19 for during World War II, and saw duty in France and Germany. Balding enlisted thinking that his small stature would land him in the Service Corps, however he was assigned to the 13th Field Battery of the 2nd Artillery division as a driver-mechanic. He was discharged before the end of the war due to a shoulder injury sustained while "fooling around" on a motorcycle. After the war in the late 1940s, Balding worked at a Toronto tire manufacturing company, and later at a golf club in Burlington. He had played golf only occasionally as a youth, but began playing more after the War ended, improving his game rapidly under the instruction of pro Les Franks.

Balding became a professional  golfer in 1950, working as a club professional in Toronto, and won his first minor tournament at 26, the Ontario assistant pro championship.

Balding began on the Canadian Professional Golf Tour, winning his first two tournaments in 1952. In 1955, Balding became the first Canadian to win a PGA Tour event in the United States, when he won the Mayfair Open. In 1957, Balding decided to play full time on the U.S. tour, winning three events on the Tour and finished 6th on the money list with $28,000, the highest of any Canadian at that point, and would not be eclipsed until Mike Weir finished 6th on the money list in 2003.

Balding would go on to win an impressive number of tournaments in many different venues over a long period of time during his career. He won ten events on the Canadian Tour from 1952 through 1973. He won four tournaments on the PGA Tour, the most of any Canadian to that point. In 1968, in Italy, he won the World Cup team title for Canada (with George Knudson), as well as the individual title. Balding played on the Canadian National Team in the Canada Cup / World Cup from 1956 to 1970, except in the years 1962, 1965 and 1966. Balding was named Ontario Athlete of the Year in 1955 and 1957. He was elected to Canada's Sports Hall of Fame in 1968.

Balding's career was slowed by several health issues, requiring shoulder surgery in 1965, and being diagnosed with blood cancer in the 1970s. Balding was also very critical of the Canadian golf establishment in the 1970s, noting that there were fewer Canadians on the U.S. tour in the 1970s then when he was active in the 1950s and 1960s.

Balding was inducted into the Canadian Golf Hall of Fame in 1984. He was also inducted into the Ontario Sports Hall of Fame in 1997. He was one of the 40 original seniors on the U.S. Senior PGA Tour in 1980. Balding Court, a street on the former St. Andrew's Golf Club in Toronto is named in his honour (it is north of York Mills Road, between Yonge Street and Bayview Avenue).

Perhaps the most remarkable win of Balding's career came at the age of 76, when he captured the 2000 Canadian PGA Senior Championship, giving him professional victories in six different decades; this was attained against players as young as age 50.

Balding was the uncle of Canadian auto racing driver Kat Teasdale.

Balding died in Mississauga, Ontario from cancer in 2006.

Professional wins (19)

PGA Tour wins (4)

PGA Tour playoff record (1–3)

Canadian wins (10)
1952 (2) Quebec Open, Canadian Match Play
1954 (1) Canadian Match Play
1955 (1) Canadian PGA Championship
1956 (1) Canadian PGA Championship
1958 (1) Canadian Match Play
1961 (1) Canadian Match Play
1963 (1) Canadian PGA Championship
1970 (1) Canadian PGA Championship
1973 (1) Alberta Open

Other wins (3)
1963 Mexican Open
1968 World Cup (team event with George Knudson and individual event)

Other senior wins (2)
1994 Liberty Mutual Legends of Golf - Demaret Division (with Jay Hebert)
2000 Canadian PGA Seniors' Championship

Results in major championships

Note: Balding never played in the PGA Championship.

CUT = missed the half-way cut
"T" indicates a tie for a place

Summary

Most consecutive cuts made – 8 (1956 Masters – 1962 U.S. Open)
Longest streak of top-10s – 1 (twice)

Team appearances
World Cup (representing Canada): 1956, 1957, 1958, 1959, 1960, 1961, 1963, 1964, 1967, 1968 (winners, individual winner), 1969, 1970
Hopkins Trophy (representing Canada): 1955, 1956

References

Works cited

External links

Profile at Canadian Golf Hall of Fame
Obituary from The Globe and Mail

Canadian male golfers
PGA Tour golfers
PGA Tour Champions golfers
Golfers from Toronto
Canadian Army personnel of World War II
Royal Regiment of Canadian Artillery personnel
Canadian Army soldiers
Deaths from cancer in Ontario
1924 births
2006 deaths